William F. Banholzer is an American Professor of Chemical and Biological Engineering at the University of Wisconsin-Madison. Prior to this role, he was formally a chemical engineer and Executive Vice President and Chief Technology Officer at the Dow Chemical Company. He is most known for his leadership of industrial R&D organizations at both Dow Chemical Company and General Electric.  He is also known for the discovery of methods related to production of synthetic diamond.  In particular, the synthesis methods he developed allowed the production of isotopically pure diamonds.

He also developed high temperature coatings, including those used in stealth technology.

In 2002, Banholzer was elected as a member into the National Academy of Engineering for breakthroughs in stealth materials and contributions to the isotope effect in solid-state physics, and for business leadership.

Education 
Banholzer received his bachelor's in chemistry (with Math emphasis) from Marquette University in 1979 and his master's and Ph.D. in chemical engineering from the University of Illinois at Urbana–Champaign. His Ph.D. was granted in 1983. Banholzer's graduate work was with R.A. Masel studying fundamental interactions with implications for catalysis.  His thesis study was "The Interaction of Nitric Oxide and Carbon Monoxide with Platinum."

Advancements to chemistry 
While a major contributor to the development of Radar-absorbent material for stealth technology, Banholzer is known primarily for the discovery, characterization, and commercial application of methods to create synthetic diamond.  His work enabled the characterization of diamonds with exceptionally high purity and isotope composition.  Banholzer was interviewed on the CBS News show 60 Minutes concerning the unique properties of these materials and over contentions surrounding inventorship.  Banholzer has 16 issued US patents, and 87 scientific publications,

Awards and achievements 
Elected to the US National Academy of Engineering (2002), Banholzer has also received American Institute of Chemical Engineers (AIChE) Government and Industry Leaders (AGILE) Award, the American Chemical Society Earle B. Barnes Award for Leadership in Chemical Research Management (2014), the Council for Chemical Research Malcolm E. Pruitt Award (2012) and the Industrial Research Institute Maurice Holland Award (2011).

Career

General Electric 
 1983-1988 - Started as a staff engineer at General Electric Corporate Research and Development.
 1989-1992 - After 5 years as a staff engineer, Bill was promoted to Manager at GE Corporate Research and Development center. In this role he oversaw the CVD Projects Program as well as Advanced Inorganic Materials Laboratory. He was named to GE's executive band in 1992
 1992-1997 - Bill transferred to the GE's Superabrasives division where he held a series of roles, including Engineering Manager-MBS Product Line for GE Plastic, Manager, R&D and Engineering for GE Plastics, and finally, Six Sigma Quality Champion - certified MBB - Manager R&D and Engineering for GE Plastics, Superabrasives Division. In this latter role, Bill was named to GE's Senior Executive Band
 1997-1999 - After 5 years a Superabrasives, Bill transferred to GE's Lighting Division as Vice President Engineering, Quality and EHS, GE Lighting (one of the youngest to be named a corporate officer in GE's history)
 1999-2005 - Vice President, Global Technology, GE Advanced Materials

Dow Chemical Company 
 July 2005 - Joined Dow Chemical as Corporate Vice President and Chief Technology Officer  During his Dow tenure he rose to the rank of Executive Vice President (effective February 2008).  His responsibilities included leading Dow's Venture Capital, New Business Development, and Licensing activities. In addition, he served as a member of the Board of Directors for the Dow Corning Corporation, the Dow AgroScience's Members Committee and the Dow Foundation Board of Directors.  He sponsored for development of the Dow Safety Academy.
 July 2013 - Announced retirement from Dow Chemical effective January 1, 2014.

University of Wisconsin 
 January 2014 - joined University of Wisconsin-Madison, as Research Professor of Chemical and Biological Engineering, an Honorary Fellow of the Chemistry Department, and Sr. Scientist of the Wisconsin Energy Institute.

References 

1957 births
Living people
American chief technology officers
Marquette University alumni
Grainger College of Engineering alumni